Plant Simulation is a computer application developed by Siemens Digital Industries Software for modelling, simulating, analyzing, visualizing and optimizing production systems and processes, the flow of materials and logistic operations. Using Tecnomatix Plant Simulation, users can optimize material flow, resource utilization and logistics for all levels of plant planning from global production facilities, through local plants, to specific lines. Within the Plant Design and Optimization Solution, the software portfolio, to which Plant Simulation belongs, is — together with the products of the Digital Factory and of Digital Manufacturing — part of the Product Lifecycle Management Software (PLM). The application allows comparing complex production alternatives, including the immanent process logic, by means of computer simulations. Plant Simulation is used by individual production planners as well as by multi-national enterprises, primarily to strategically plan layout, and control logic and dimensions of large, complex production investments. It is one of the major products that dominate that market space.

Product description 
Plant Simulation is a Material flow simulation Software (Discrete Event Simulation; DES Software). Using simulation, complex and dynamic enterprise workflows are evaluated to arrive at mathematically safeguarded entrepreneurial decisions. The Computer model allows the user to execute experiments and to run through 'what if scenarios' without either having to experiment with the real production environment or when applied within the planning phase, long before the real system exists. In general, the Material flow analysis is used when discrete production processes are running. These processes are characterized by non-steady material flows, which means that the part is either there or not there, the shift takes place or does not take place, and the machine works without errors or reports a failure. These processes resist simple mathematical descriptions and derivations due to numerous dependencies. Before powerful computers were available, most problems of material flow simulation were solved by means of queuing theory and operations research methods. In most cases, the solutions resulting from these calculations were hard to understand and were marked by a large number of boundary conditions and restrictions that were hard to abide by in reality.

Languages 
Plant Simulation is available in English, German, Japanese, Hungarian, Russian and Chinese. The user can create individual Dialog boxes using double-byte characters and offering individual parameterizations. The user can switch between the available languages.

Special features 
Object-oriented programming with
Inheritance: Users create libraries with their own objects, which can be re-used. As opposed to a copy, any change to an object class within the library is propagated to any of the derived objects (children).
Polymorphism: Classes can be derived and derived methods can be redefined. This enables users to build complex models faster, easier and with a clearer structure.
Hierarchy: Complex structures can be created very clearly on several (logic) layers. This facilitates a Top-down and bottom-up design approach.
Openness for importing data from other systems, such as Access or Oracle data bases, Excel worksheets or from SAP.
 Integration: Plant Simulation is part of the Digital factory and supports
importing data from PLM systems or be used during
Virtual Commissioning
taking over layout data from AutoCAD, Microstation, Factory CAD, etc. directly into the simulation.
Provides comprehensible analysis tools for detecting bottlenecks (Bottleneck Analyzer), for tracking the flow of materials (Sankey diagrams) or for detecting over-dimensioned resources (Chart Wizard).
 Provides integrated optimization tools:
The Experiment Manager automatically creates scenarios or evaluates dependencies between two input parameters.
Genetic algorithms search large solution spaces.
Neural networks show the connection between input and output parameters and can be used for forecasting.
Data analysis: Detection of dependencies, Regression analysis, best fitting function etc.

Scope of application

Calculation of enterprise characteristics 
Goal: 
Detect and show problems which might otherwise cause costs and time-intensive correction measures during the ramp-up phase.
Offer mathematically calculated key performance indicators (KPI) instead of expert's "gut feelings."
Reduce investment costs for production lines without endangering the required output quantities.
Optimize the performance of existing production lines.
Incorporate machine failures and availabilities (MTTR, MTBF) when calculating throughput numbers and utilization.

Visualization 
Plant Simulation can display production sequences in 2D and in 3D. The 3D display is especially helpful as a sales tool or for in-house communication of planned measures. In addition it allows to present the entire system concept within a virtual, interactive, immersive environment to non-simulation experts. The 3D engine is based on the industry standard JT format. CAD applications such as NX, Solid Edge can export models in this format. The 3D data files can be imported in the JT format '.jt' by using Drag-and-drop.

Used in 
Plant Simulation is used in most industries. Especially in the 
Automotive industry Automotive Industry Workgroup Material Flow Simulation
Automotive suppliers
Aerospace 
Plant manufacturing
Mechanical engineering
Process industry
Electronics industry
Consumer packaged goods industry 
Airports
Logistics companies (transport logistics, storage logistics and production logistics)
High bay warehouse suppliers, suppliers of automated guided vehicle systems and electric overhead monorail systems
Consulting houses and service providers
Shipyards Simulation Cooperation in the Maritime Industries; SimCoMar is an interest group of shipyards and suppliers, universities and institutions engaged in the simulation of shipbuilding
Harbors, especially container terminals 
Lately material flow simulation gains growing importance through the increasing use for considering the sustainability of industrial production processes. Here the characteristics of sustainable manufacturing are simulated and analysed beforehand and then integrated into the investment decision process.
Plant Simulation is also used for research and development purposes at a great number of universities and universities of applied science.

Application history

References

Further reading 
 Steffen Bangsow: ‘Manufacturing Simulation with Plant Simulation and SimTalk Usage and Programming with Examples and Solutions’ Springer-Verlag, Heidelberg 2009, .

External links 
 Video: Plant Simulation Introduction Video
 Tecnomatix Plant Simulation on the Siemens Digital Industries Software official web page
 Siemens Digital Industries Software official Webpage
 Open Tecnomatix Plant Simulation community and discussion forum
 Case Study (Wayback Machine)
 Series of demo videos

Product lifecycle management
Project management software
Siemens software products
Simulation software
Business software for Windows